Johann Andersag (better known as Hans Andersag) was a scientist born on February 16, 1902, in Lana, Tyrol, Austria-Hungary (now South Tyrol, Italy), and died August 10, 1955, in Wuppertal, Germany, following bronchial cancer. While working for Bayer AG, he discovered chloroquine, the active ingredient in the malaria drug Resochin. He also first synthesized vitamin B6 with Richard Kuhn, Kurt Westphal, and Gerhardt Wendt. He was awarded a doctorate degree for his dissertation "Synthese des natürlichen Koproporphyrins sowie zweier damit isomerer Porphyrine" at the Technical University Munich on September 9, 1927.

He was married to Else Andersag (née Nouvortne). The couple lived with their three daughters Christel, Marianne and Renate on Jaegerhofstrasse 44 in Wuppertal-Elberfeld. Hans Andersag's grave and gravestone are located at the "Alter Lutherischer Friedhof an der Hochstrasse" in Wuppertal-Elberfeld.

See also
History of malaria

References

Pictures

1902 births
1955 deaths
Technical University of Munich alumni
People from Lana, South Tyrol
Malariologists
Austrian emigrants to Germany